Abdelhakim Omrani (born 18 February 1991) is a French professional footballer who plays as an attacking midfielder for RFCU Luxembourg.

Club career
Omrani began his career playing for Metz. He later left the club for Nancy, where he spent six years before heading north to RC Lens. Omrani received his first call up to the senior squad for the team's match against Angers on 6 March 2009. He made his professional debut in that match appearing as a substitute in the 72nd minute. The match finished 2–2 with Lens scoring their goals in the 88th minute and the 92nd minute. The following week, Omrani made another substitute appearance in a 1–0 defeat to Ajaccio. In August 2011, Omrani went on trial to German club Bayern Munich. However, despite impressing, the two clubs could not agree to terms and Omrani remained at Lens. In December 2012, Omrani went on trial with Newcastle United. However, he failed to impress manager Alan Pardew and returned to Lens. On 14 February 2012, Lens announced that Omrani had left the club.

In November 2013, Omrani signed a two-year contract with Nîmes Olympique, after Le Mans suffered relegation to the lower divisions for financial reasons.

On 5 September 2017, Omrani signed a one-year contract, with an option for a further year, with League One side Oldham Athletic. He was released by Oldham at the end of the 2017–18 season, following their relegation. He went on to the Belgian amateur level and R.E. Virton.

In January 2020, Omrani moved to Racing FC Union Luxembourg after six months without a club.

International career
After previously representing France at the under-19 level, Omrani switched his allegiance to Algeria in September 2011 after being called up to the Algerian under-23 national team by coach Azzedine Aït Djoudi for a four-day training camp in Sidi Moussa. He was convinced to make the switch by Algerian international Antar Yahia.

Personal life
Omrani was born in Freyming-Merlebach in the Moselle department to parents of Algerian descent. He comes from an athletic family which consists of six children. The eldest, Yasmina, is a professional heptathlete. Omrani also has two younger brothers who play football: Billel played for CFR Cluj and is a French youth international while Nabil has played in the youth system of a local club in Marseille.

Career statistics

References

External links
 
 

1991 births
Living people
People from Freyming-Merlebach
French sportspeople of Algerian descent
Algerian footballers
Algerian expatriate footballers
Algeria under-23 international footballers
French footballers
French expatriate footballers
Association football midfielders
RC Lens players
AS Nancy Lorraine players
Le Mans FC players
Nîmes Olympique players
Chamois Niortais F.C. players
Oldham Athletic A.F.C. players
R.E. Virton players
FC Dunărea Călărași players
Racing FC Union Luxembourg players
Ligue 1 players
Ligue 2 players
Liga I players
Luxembourg National Division players
France youth international footballers
Expatriate footballers in England
French expatriate sportspeople in England 
Algerian expatriate sportspeople in England
Expatriate footballers in Belgium
French expatriate sportspeople in Belgium
Algerian expatriate sportspeople in Belgium
Expatriate footballers in Romania
French expatriate sportspeople in Romania
Algerian expatriate sportspeople in Romania
Expatriate footballers in Luxembourg
French expatriate sportspeople in Luxembourg
Algerian expatriate sportspeople in Luxembourg
Sportspeople from Moselle (department)
Footballers from Grand Est